Steven Philip Cheetham (born 5 September 1987) is an English cricketer. He is a right-handed batsman and a right-arm fast bowler who plays for Lancashire. He was born in Oldham, Greater Manchester, and attended Bury Grammar School. He has a fabulous sister, Caroline. Cheetham, who also plays local league cricket for Clifton Cricket Club, made his Second XI debut back in 2004. Cheetham is a right arm fast/medium bowler and a lower order batsman . He spent six months on 5 separate occasions over in Australia playing for Cheltenham Cricket Club, a local Melbourne side where he took 54 wickets at an average of 9.80, including a hat-trick in the semi final against Old Mentonians. Steven is a keen football fan and is a season ticket holder at Oldham Athletic.



Career

Lancashire
Steven Cheetham made his debut in first-class cricket in a match between Lancashire and Durham University in April 2007. A year later, Cheetham played his maiden list A match; on 18 May, Lancashire played Durham. Cheetham took 2/39 as Lancashire lost by six runs. Until his loan to Surrey towards the end of the 2010 season, Cheetham played thirty five list A matches for Lancashire, including one against each of the Bangladesh and West Indies A teams.

On loan to Surrey
On 4 August 2010, Cheetham moved to Surrey until the end of the 2010 season on loan. With limited opportunities to play first-team cricket at Lancashire after a run of injuries, there was a greater chance to play at Surrey who at the time had suffered injuries to their bowling attack. According to Chris Adams, Surrey's cricket manager, "Steven is a young bowler with terrific physical attributes, who bowls wicket to wicket and is very much at the start of his career". Drafted straight into the team, Cheetham played his first match for Surrey the same day. In what was a rain-effected match against Glamorgan.  Cheetham's first first-class game at Surrey was in the second-division match against Leicestershire and was curtailed by rain, and in an effort to contrive a result, Surrey used declaration bowling and then forfeited an innings to set up a run-chase. Consequentially, Cheetham did not bowl in Leicestershire's first innings, although he took 2/71 in the second as the match headed for a draw. In a match against The Unicorns on 22 August, Cheetham took 4 wickets for 32 runs while opening the bowling, beating his previous best figures in list A cricket.

Following an injury to Lancashire captain and bowler Glen Chapple in September, Cheetham was recalled early from his stint with Surrey. In October 2011, the season where Lancashire won the county championship, having been unable to break into Lancashire's first-team due to a serious long term recurring ankle injury, Cheetham was released by the club. He then went on to have one final season with Yorkshire County Cricket Club.

Other Achievements

Before signing for Lancashire, Cheetham played football for Oldham Athletic.

Represented the England national cricket side in varying age groups.

Took 10 wickets in an innings against Rochdale Cricket club in 2013 with match figures of 10/18 from 19.2 overs.

References

External links
Steven Cheetham at Cricket Archive
Steven Cheetham at VTCA
Steven Cheetham at Cheltenham C.C

1987 births
English cricketers
Lancashire cricketers
Living people
People from Oldham
Surrey cricketers
Unicorns cricketers